Stella Soulioti (13 February 1920 – 1 November 2012) was a Cypriot attorney and politician.

She was born in Limassol, the daughter of the lawyer Sir Panayiotis Cacoyannnis, and the sister of the film director Michael Cacoyannis. Soulioti was the first Cypriot woman to join the RAF during World War II, retiring with the rank of lieutenant. She received her education in Cyprus and in Egypt before being called to the bar as a member of Gray's Inn in 1951. She returned to Cyprus, practicing law in her birth city from 1952 until 1960. In 1961 she took the helm of the Red Cross in Cyprus, leading the organization until 2004; at the time of the Turkish invasion of 1974, she was responsible for coordinating thousands of volunteers, which gained her international recognition. She was a follower of Archbishop Makarios, with whom she worked closely, and in 1960 she was named justice minister of Cyprus, the first woman in the world to hold such a position. She remained in the post until 1970, serving as well as Minister of Health from 1964 to 1966; between 1971 and 1974 she was the island's first Commissioner of Law, and from 1984 to 1988 she served as attorney general, the first woman in the nation's history to hold the post. From 1987 until 1991 she was a member of UNESCO's executive board. She held numerous other honorary posts in Cyprus throughout her career, and in 1982 and 1983 spent time as a visiting fellow at Wolfson College, Cambridge. Soulioti married Demetrios Souliotis in 1949. She died in Limassol, and was survived by her daughter.

External links 

 Archive of Stella Soulioti in the University of Cyprus

References

1920 births
2012 deaths
Greek Cypriot people
Cypriot women lawyers
Women government ministers of Cyprus
20th-century Cypriot lawyers
20th-century Cypriot women politicians
20th-century Cypriot politicians
Members of Gray's Inn
People from Limassol
Female justice ministers
Health ministers of Cyprus
Cyprus Ministers of Justice and Public Order
Attorneys-General of Cyprus